

Perumpāṇāṟṟuppaṭai (lit. "guide for bards with the large lute") is an ancient Tamil poem in the Pattuppattu anthology of the Sangam literature. It contains 500 lines in the akaval meter. It is one of five arruppatai genre poems and was a guide to other bards seeking a patron for their art. Set as a praise for chieftain Tonataiman Ilantiraiyan of the Kanchi territory, it was composed by Uruttirankannanar sometime around 190–200 CE, states Kamil Zvelebil – a Tamil literature scholar. While the poem is from the 2nd century, it was likely added to the Pattuppāṭṭu anthology in the 4th or 5th century CE, states Dennis Hudson – an Indologist and World Religions scholar.

The Perumpāṇāṟṟuppaṭai poem, also referred to as Perumpanattrupadai, is named after perumpanar – a class of minstrels who sang their bards while playing a large lute. The poem provides a detailed description of the five tinai (landscapes) of Kanchi territory: mountainous (kurinci), forested (palai), pastoral (mullai), farmlands (marutam), coastal (neytal). The capital city of Kanchipuram is described as a city of ancient might, fame, prosperity and abounding in religious festivals.

The poem is a source of cultural and sociological information about ancient Kanchipuram and nearby regions, along with the government and economic systems under Tamil chieftains. Of sociological interest are the distinctive lifestyles of robbers who are described in Perumpanattrupadai as living in fortified villages, while the lifestyle of hunters, fishermen, farmers, and herdsmen are described to be different. The poem mentions Neerpayattu as a thriving seaport, the city of Kanchi as having suburbs, the ruler as someone generous to the bards.  The chieftain Ilantiraiyan is of historic importance since he is mentioned in other Sangam literature, such as in Purananuru and Natrinai, as well as described as a poet that adds to his own fame.

In the cultural context, the poem mentions a yupa post (a form of Vedic altar) and a Brahmin village. Vedas are recited by these Brahmins, and even their parrots are mentioned in the poem as those who sing the Vedic hymns. People in these Vedic villages did not eat meat, nor raise fowls. They ate rice, salad leaves boiled in ghee, pickles and vegetables. Elsewhere, the hunters are described as meat-eaters, herdsmen relied on milk, yoghurt and ghee, fishermen ate a variety of fish, while farmers ate the meat of domestic fowl, beans, fruits and farm produce. Rice was a staple in all landscapes. Rice was also a major part of any offerings to the gods in temples and on festivals, according to several lines in the poem, such as over lines 267–269.

The Perumpanattrupadai mentions Vishnu and describes him as the god who is "tall, dark-skinned" and as one from whom "the four-faced god was born" (a Puranic legend about Brahma being born from Vishnu's navel). The poem also mentions a mother goddess (Parvati, Uma), whom it alludes to as "beauteous queen whose great womb bore the red god" (Murugan). In its similes, it mentions the Ganges river, the Pandavas of the Mahabharata, and the Yoga adept rishis (sages). According to Hudson, the poem is notable that it explicitly mentions three temples and alludes to one additional temple for these gods. The similes used in the poem are those found in the Vedic and Puranic mythologies of Hinduism.

In the context of government structure and economic activity, the poem mentions the Kanchi king surrounding himself with counselors, as having a fair system to adjudicate disputes and deliver justice, someone who was ruthless against his enemies and robbers. He rode lotus-topped chariot. His coastal regions had lighthouses and other infrastructure to guide the ships, swan-shaped lamps were imported from the yavanas (Greek-Romans, or foreigners to Tamil region), farmers using bullocks as aid to agriculture, blacksmith using bellows made from animal skin (kollan), the production of salt and its export, pepper trade, and merchant highways guarded by soldiers.

A variety of religious festivals and sports are mentioned in the poem, in which both men and women participated. The poem has at least 73 similes.

See also
 Eighteen Greater Texts
 Sangam literature

Notes

References

Bibliography

 
 
 
 Mudaliyar, Singaravelu A., Apithana Cintamani, An encyclopaedia of Tamil Literature, (1931) - Reprinted by Asian Educational Services, New Delhi (1983)
 
 
 Selby, Martha Ann (2011) Tamil Love Poetry: The Five Hundred Short Poems of the Aiṅkuṟunūṟu, an Early Third-Century Anthology. Columbia University Press, 

 
 
 

Sangam literature
Tamil Hindu literature